The 20th Dallas–Fort Worth Film Critics Association Awards honoring the best in film for 2014 were announced on December 15, 2014. These awards "recognizing extraordinary accomplishment in film" are presented annually by the Dallas–Fort Worth Film Critics Association (DFWFCA), based in the Dallas–Fort Worth metroplex region of Texas. The organization, founded in 1990, includes 30 film critics for print, radio, television, and internet publications based in north Texas. The Dallas–Fort Worth Film Critics Association began presenting its annual awards list in 1993.

Birdman was the DFWFCA's most awarded film of 2014, taking five top honors. Birdman won in Best Picture, Best Actor (Michael Keaton), Best Director (Alejandro G. Iñárritu), Best Cinematography (Emmanuel Lubezki), and Best Screenplay (Alejandro G. Iñárritu, Nicolás Giacobone, Alexander Dinelaris Jr., and Armando Bo).

Another film, Boyhood, earned multiple 2014 honors from the DFWFCA. The coming-of-age tale received top honors in the Best Supporting Actress (Patricia Arquette) as well as being presented the Russell Smith Award as the "best low-budget or cutting-edge independent film" of the year. The award is named in honor of late Dallas Morning News film critic Russell Smith. Reese Witherspoon was named Best Actress for her role as Cheryl Strayed in Wild. The other films earning honors were Sweden's Force Majeure for Best Foreign Language Film, Citizenfour as Best Documentary Film, and The Lego Movie for Best Animated Film.

Winners
Winners are listed first and highlighted with boldface. Other films ranked by the annual poll are listed in order. While most categories saw 5 honorees named, categories ranged from as many as 10 (Best Film) to as few as 2 (Best Cinematography, Best Animated Film, Best Screenplay) plus the Best Musical Score category having only the winner announced.

Category awards

Individual awards

Russell Smith Award
 Boyhood, for "best low-budget or cutting-edge independent film"

References

2014
2014 film awards